The 2018 AFF U-19 Youth Championship was an international football tournament that was held in Indonesia from 1 July to 14 July. The 11 national teams involved in the tournament were required to register a squad of 23 players; only players in these squads are eligible to take part in the tournament.

Group A

Head Coach:  Indra Sjafri

Head Coach:  Issara Sritaro

Head Coach:  Hoàng Anh Tuấn

Head Coach:  Rob Servais

Head Coach:  Reiji Hirata

Head Coach:  Chusak Sriphum

Group B

Head Coach:  Bojan Hodak

Head Coach:  Myo Hlaing Win

Head Coach:  Kim Shinh-Wan

Head Coach:  Musashi Mizushima

Head Coach:  Takao Fujiwara

References

External links
 AFF website

AFF U-19 Youth Championship
Association football tournament squads